The Dayak blue flycatcher (Cyornis montanus) is a species of bird in the family Muscicapidae.
It is endemic to the island of Borneo. The Dayak blue flycatcher, formerly considered conspecific with the Javan blue flycatcher (Cyornis banyumas), was split as a distinct species by the IOC in 2021.

References

Dayak blue flycatcher
Endemic birds of Borneo
Dayak blue flycatcher
Dayak blue flycatcher
Dayak blue flycatcher